The Pacific Dover sole (Microstomus pacificus), also called the slime sole or slippery sole, is a Pacific flatfish of the flounder family which ranges from Baja California to the Bering Sea.  It takes its name from a resemblance to the common sole of Europe, which is often called Dover sole.

Pacific Dover sole can live for 45 years. The species was identified in proximity to a methane seep off the coast of Del Mar in Southern California. Males begin to spawn at four years of age, while females begin to spawn at age five.

Use as food
Pacific Dover sole is generally sold whole, in steaks, or in fillets. The skin is generally removed before cooking, as it is slimy. It is mild-tasting, with firm flesh, though "not as mild as European Dover sole". The Monterey Bay Aquarium Seafood Watch lists Pacific Dover Sole from California, US West Coast, and Alaska fisheries as "Best Choice", with fish from British Columbia listed as a "Good Alternative" due to concerns over bycatch of overfished and otherwise at-risk species.

References

Pacific Dover sole
Western North American coastal fauna
Dover sole
Taxa named by William Neale Lockington